Tresserve is a commune in the Savoie department in the Auvergne-Rhône-Alpes region in south-eastern France. It is part of the urban area of Chambéry.

Twin towns — sister cities
Tresserve is twinned with:

  Avigliana, Italy

See also
Communes of the Savoie department

World heritage site
It is home to one or more prehistoric pile-dwelling (or stilt house) settlements that are part of the Prehistoric Pile dwellings around the Alps UNESCO World Heritage Site.

References

Communes of Savoie